Minnesota State Highway 241 (MN 241) is a  highway in Minnesota, which runs from its intersection with Wright County State-Aid Highway 19 (Main Street / La Beaux Avenue) and Wright County State-Aid Highway 35 in St. Michael and continues east to its eastern terminus at its interchange with Interstate 94 and Wright County State-Aid Highway 36 in St. Michael.

MN 241 is also known as Central Avenue E and 42nd Street NE in the city of St. Michael.

Route description
Highway 241 serves as an east–west connector route between St. Michael and Interstate 94/US Highway 52. The maximum speed limit is 60 miles per hour between the junction with Interstate 94 and Wright County Highway 19 in Saint Michael.

Highway 241 generally follows the Crow River throughout its route.

The Crow-Hassan Park Reserve is located south of the junction of Highway 241 and Naber Avenue (Territorial Road).  The nearby park entrance is located across the Crow River on Sylvan Lake Road / Park Drive in Hanover.

The route is legally defined as Route 241 in the Minnesota Statutes.

History
Highway 241 was authorized on July 1, 1949. Part of the road follows part of the original alignment of Highway 152. The highway was not marked until 1955, when the new alignment of 152 (now Interstate 94) began construction around the north side of St. Michael.

Highway 241 was paved when it was marked.

Due to burgeoning commuter traffic between the Twin Cities and the northwest suburbs, Highway 241 was expanded in 2007 from two to four lanes and traffic lights were added at major intersections along the route.

Major intersections

References

241
Transportation in Wright County, Minnesota